Rush Green Hospital was a hospital located at Rush Green in the London Borough of Barking and Dagenham in London from 1900 to 1995.

History
The hospital was opened as the Romford Isolation Hospital by Romford Rural District Council in co-operation with Romford Urban District Council (the hospital was located in Romford Rural District) in April 1901. The rural district was abolished and the hospital became part of the Dagenham district in April 1926.

The facility was renamed Rush Green Hospital in 1939 and it joined the National Health Service in 1948. It closed in 1995 and the site has been redeveloped for housing and for use as a medical centre.

See also
 Healthcare in London
 List of hospitals in England

References

External links
Barking and Dagenham London Borough Council - Photographic archive
Website with more about Rush Green Hospital - Various Content

Hospitals established in 1900
1900 establishments in England
1994 disestablishments in England
Health in the London Borough of Barking and Dagenham
Hospital buildings completed in 1900
NHS hospitals in London
Defunct hospitals in London